The 2011 European Junior Championship was the sixth European Junior Championship. It was held from August 28 to September 3, 2011 in Sevilla, Spain.

Qualification 
A total of 14 teams join the competition for the 2011 title of Junior European Champion. The number of teams was increased by three since the last qualification for the 2008 championship in Seville.

Three teams had a guaranteed place in the Final Tournament: Germany and Sweden (the top two teams from the last championship) and Spain (as the host). The remaining three spots were selected in a three-round qualification format. The teams were seeded in the schedule by their rankings.

Round One

Round Two 
Switzerland resigned and was replaced by the Netherlands in the tournament.

Round Three

Qualified teams 
 (host nation)
 (defending champion)
 (runner-up)
 (won Serbia 35–0)
 (won Finland 20–14)
 (won Russia by w.o.)

Matches

Group A

Group B

5th Place

3rd Place

Final

See also 
 2011 in sports

References

External links
 2011 European Junior Championship

European Junior Championship
2011
2011 in Spanish sport
International sports competitions hosted by Spain
Sports competitions in Seville
American football in Spain
21st century in Seville